The Fort Meade Street Railway was chartered in January 1886 with a 99-year franchise. It opened on January 1, 1887, to connect the center of Fort Meade and the new Florida Southern Railway depot. The charter granted it the exclusive right-of-way in the town of Fort Meade, Florida, and exempted it from city taxes for ten years. The railroad had two miles of  narrow gauge track and owned two cars and two horses. In 1904 the directors were: Max Reif, President: M. M. Loadhollis, Vice-president: W. H. Francis, Secretary: L. B. Flood; E. O. Flood was Treasurer and J. G. Carter, Manager. C. E. Roberts is shown as Vice-president in the 1907 Poor's Manual with the other officers being the same. The general offices were in Fort Meade. Operations ceased in 1913.

See also
 List of Florida street railroads

References

3 ft gauge railways in the United States
Florida street railroads
Railway companies established in 1886
Railway companies disestablished in 1913
1886 establishments in Florida
Fort Meade, Florida